Mohamad Fairuz bin Mohamed Fauzy (born 24 October 1982 in Kuala Lumpur, Malaysia) is a Malaysian professional race car driver.

Early career

Fairuz started competing in karting events in 1994 before making the move to British Formula Ford at the start of 1999. He moved to British Formula Renault in 2000, developing his skills there before moving up to British Formula 3 in 2002, albeit in the B-Class.

He moved up to the main class in 2003, driving for both the SYR and Promatecme teams, before driving for both the Menu and P1 teams in 2004. He moved to the GP2 Series for 2005, becoming one of a number of Asian drivers in the championship. Despite being the only driver to start every race and not score a point, he continued in the series for 2006, again scoring no points. During this time he was also one of A1 Team Malaysia's drivers (along with Alex Yoong) in the A1 Grand Prix series.

Fairuz raced in the Formula Renault 3.5 Series for the Cram Competition team.

He returned to GP2 for 2008, driving for the Super Nova team in the GP2 Asia Series. In 2009, he competed in the Formula Renault 3.5 Series for Mofaz Racing. After entering the final race in sixth place, Fairuz finished second in the race at the Ciudad del Motor de Aragón and leapfrogged the four drivers above him, to finish as runner-up to Bertrand Baguette in the championship standings.

Formula One
On 9 November 2009 Lotus Racing chief technical officer Mike Gascoyne confirmed Fairuz would be the test driver for the team but cooled down talks he was going to get a race seat.<ref></</ref>

Fairuz was announced as the third driver for Lotus on 13 December 2009.

Fairuz replaced Heikki Kovalainen in the first free practice session at the 2010 Malaysian Grand Prix, as Jarno Trulli won a coin toss against Kovalainen. He drove a total of nineteen laps during the session, setting the 22nd fastest time, beating the Hispania Racing cars of Karun Chandhok and Bruno Senna. He also took part in the first practice session at the British Grand Prix, replacing Jarno Trulli, where he set the 23rd fastest time (1:39.510) ahead of the Hispania Racing car of Sakon Yamamoto. He replaced Heikki Kovalainen for the first free practice session of the German Grand Prix and the Abu Dhabi Grand Prix. At the end of the 2010 season, Fairuz parted company with Lotus Racing after one year of his five-year contract.

The relationship between Lotus Racing and Group Lotus soured during 2010, resulting in GL deciding to withdraw its backing from the team and instead sponsoring Renault F1 for the  season onwards. As part of the deal, Fairuz became one of Renault's test and reserve drivers, alongside Bruno Senna, Romain Grosjean and Ho-Pin Tung.

Post-Formula One

After stating his desire to return to full-time racing for 2011, Fairuz re-signed for Super Nova Racing to drive in the 2011 GP2 Series and 2011 GP2 Asia Series, alongside Luca Filippi and Johnny Cecotto Jr. respectively. After finishing fourteenth in the Asia series, he scored his first main series points in the first round of the championship. He finished 18th in the main series championship.

Racing record

Career summary

‡ Team standings

Complete A1 Grand Prix results
(key) (Races in bold indicate pole position) (Races in italics indicate fastest lap)

Complete GP2 Series results
(key) (Races in bold indicate pole position) (Races in italics indicate fastest lap)

Complete GP2 Asia Series results
(key) (Races in bold indicate pole position) (Races in italics indicate fastest lap)

Complete Formula Renault 3.5 Series results
(key) (Races in bold indicate pole position) (Races in italics indicate fastest lap)

Complete Super GT results
(key) (Races in bold indicate pole position) (Races in italics indicate fastest lap)

Complete Formula One results
(key) (Races in bold indicate pole position; races in italics indicate fastest lap)

References
Career statistics from driverdb.com.  Retrieved on 12 July 2008.

External links

 Official website

1982 births
Living people
Malaysian racing drivers
GP2 Series drivers
British Formula Renault 2.0 drivers
A1 Team Malaysia drivers
British Formula Three Championship drivers
Malaysian people of Malay descent
Malaysian Muslims
Formula Ford drivers
GP2 Asia Series drivers
Sportspeople from Kuala Lumpur
World Series Formula V8 3.5 drivers
Super GT drivers
Asian Le Mans Series drivers
Super Nova Racing drivers
Cram Competition drivers
Fortec Motorsport drivers
OAK Racing drivers
A1 Grand Prix drivers
P1 Motorsport drivers
DAMS drivers